The 2016–17 Armenian Cup is the 26th season of Armenia's football knockout competition. It features the six 2016–17 Premier League teams, plus Erebuni and Kotayk from the 2016–17 First Division. The tournament begins on 21 September 2016, with Banants the defending champions, having won their third title the previous season.

Quarterfinals

Semifinals
The four winners from the Quarterfinals were drawn into two two-legged ties.

Final

Scorers
2 goals:

 Kamo Hovhannisyan – Pyunik
 Kyrian Nwabueze – Shirak

1 goals:

 Yuriy Fomenko – Alashkert
 Gegham Tumbaryan – Ararat Yerevan
 Nassim Aaron Kpehia – Ararat Yerevan
 Orbeli Hambardzumyan – Banants
 Edgar Movsesyan – Banants
 Nenad Injac – Banants
 Lubambo Musonda – Gandzasar Kapan
 Alik Arakelyan – Pyunik
 Petros Avetisyan – Pyunik
 Aram Shakhnazaryan – Pyunik
 Vahan Bichakhchyan – Shirak
 Oumarou Kaina – Shirak

Own goals:
 Aram Bareghamyan (11 April 2017 vs Pyunik)
 Vaspurak Minasyan (26 April 2017 vs Shirak)

References

Armenian Cup seasons
Armenian Cup
Cup